The 2018 AFL season was the 122nd season of the Australian Football League (AFL), the highest level senior men's Australian rules football competition in Australia, which was known as the Victorian Football League until 1989. The season featured eighteen clubs, ran from 22 March until 29 September, and comprised a 22-game home-and-away season followed by a finals series featuring the top eight clubs.

The premiership was won by the West Coast Eagles for the fourth time, after it defeated  by five points in the AFL Grand Final.

Pre-season

AFLX

On 17 November 2017, the AFL confirmed that the pre-season would feature an AFLX competition. The game is played on a soccer-sized pitch over two ten minute halves. Each team features seven players on the field and three interchange players. Teams were split into three groups of six, with a grand final to be held for each group. The matches were played from 15–17 February 2018. The winners of the competition were Adelaide, Melbourne and Brisbane.

JLT Community Series

The pre-season series of games returned as the 2018 JLT Community Series. The number of games was reduced compared to the previous season, with teams playing two games each. The games were stand-alone, with no overall winner of the series. Each team played two games, many at suburban or regional venues, while all games were televised on Fox Footy.

Premiership season

Round 1

Round 2

Round 3

Round 4

Round 5

Round 6

Round 7

Round 8

Round 9

Round 10

Round 11

Round 12

Round 13

Round 14

Round 15

Round 16

Round 17

Round 18

Round 19

Round 20

Round 21

Round 22

Round 23

Season notes
 lost its first seven matches, the longest losing streak to start a season in the club's history.
 Carlton's total of two wins for the season was the club's fewest wins in a season since 1901.
 qualified for the finals for the first time since 2006.

Win/loss table

Bold – Home game
X – Bye
Opponent for round listed above margin

Ladder

Ladder progression
Numbers highlighted in green indicates the team finished the round inside the top 8.
Numbers highlighted in blue indicates the team finished in first place on the ladder in that round.
Numbers highlighted in red indicates the team finished in last place on the ladder in that round.
Underlined numbers indicates the team had a bye during that round.
Subscript numbers indicate ladder position at round's end.

Positions of teams round by round

Finals series

Week one

Week two

Week three

Week four

Finals notes
 qualified for a preliminary final for the first time since 2000, and qualified for the finals for the first time since 2006.
 qualified for the grand final for the first time since 2011, and qualified for the finals for the first time since 2013.

Attendances

By club

By ground

Awards

The Brownlow Medal was awarded to Tom Mitchell of  who polled 28 votes.
It was the third time Riewoldt has won the award. 
The AFL Players Association Awards:
The Leigh Matthews Trophy was awarded to Tom Mitchell of  polling 773 votes ahead of Patrick Cripps who polled 529.
The AFL Coaches Association Awards:
The AFL Coaches Association Player of the Year Award was awarded to Max Gawn of  who received 97 votes ahead of Patrick Cripps who received 91.
The Gary Ayres Award for the best player in the finals series was awarded to Steele Sidebottom of  who polled 23 votes ahead of teammate Taylor Adams on 18.
The Allan Jeans Senior Coach of the Year Award was awarded to  coach Nathan Buckley.
The Assistant Coach of the Year Award was awarded to  assistant Rhyce Shaw for the second year in a row.
The Lifetime Achievement Award was awarded to Alan Stewart for his contribution to football in South Australia.
The Best Young Player Award was awarded to Tom Stewart of  who received 40 votes.
The Media Award was awarded to Gerard Whateley for the fifth consecutive year.

Milestones

Coleman Medal
Numbers highlighted in blue indicates the player led the Coleman Medal at the end of that round.
Numbers underlined indicates the player did not play in that round.

Best and fairest

Club leadership

Club membership

See also 

2018 AFL Women's season

References 

Australian Football League seasons
2018 Australian Football League season
2018 in Australian rules football